The Handley Page Halifax is a British Royal Air Force (RAF) four-engined heavy bomber of the Second World War. It was developed by Handley Page to the same specification as the contemporary twin-engine Avro Manchester.

The Halifax has its origins in the twin-engine HP56 proposal of the late 1930s, produced in response to the British Air Ministry's Specification P.13/36 for a capable medium bomber for "world-wide use." The HP56 was ordered as a backup to the Avro 679, both aircraft being designed to use the underperforming Rolls-Royce Vulture engine. The Handley Page design was altered at the Ministry to a four-engine arrangement powered by the Rolls-Royce Merlin engine; the rival Avro 679 was produced as the twin-engine Avro Manchester which, while regarded as unsuccessful mainly due to the Vulture engine, was a direct predecessor of the famed Avro Lancaster. Both the Lancaster and the Halifax emerged as capable four-engined strategic bombers, thousands of which were built and operated by the RAF and several other services during the War.

On 25 October 1939, the Halifax performed its maiden flight, and it entered service with the RAF on 13 November 1940. It quickly became a major component of Bomber Command, performing routine strategic bombing missions against the Axis Powers, many of them at night. Arthur Harris, the Air Officer Commanding-in-Chief of Bomber Command, described the Halifax as inferior to the rival Lancaster (in part due to its smaller payload) though this opinion was not shared by many of the crews that flew it, particularly for the MkIII variant. Nevertheless, production of the Halifax continued until April 1945. During their service with Bomber Command, Halifaxes flew a total of 82,773 operations and dropped 224,207 tons of bombs, while 1,833 aircraft were lost. The Halifax was also flown in large numbers by other Allied and Commonwealth nations, such as the Royal Canadian Air Force (RCAF), Royal Australian Air Force (RAAF), Free French Air Force and Polish forces.

Various improved versions of the Halifax were introduced, incorporating more powerful engines, a revised defensive turret layout and increased payload. It remained in service with Bomber Command until the end of the war, performing a variety of duties in addition to bombing. Specialised versions of the Halifax were developed for troop transport and paradrop operations. Following the end of the Second World War, the RAF quickly retired the Halifax, after the type was succeeded as a strategic bomber by the Avro Lincoln, an advanced derivative of the Lancaster. During the post-war years, the Halifax was operated by the Royal Egyptian Air Force, the French Air Force and the Royal Pakistan Air Force. The type also entered commercial service for a number of years, used mainly as a freighter. A dedicated civil transport variant, the Handley Page Halton, was also developed and entered airline service; 41 civil Halifax freighters were used during the Berlin Airlift. In 1961, the last remaining Halifax bombers were retired from operational use.

Development

Origins

In the 1930s, the Royal Air Force (RAF) was primarily interested in twin-engine bombers. These designs put significant demands on engine production and maintenance, both of which were already stretched with the introduction of many new types of aircraft into service. Power limitations were so serious that the British invested heavily in the development of huge engines in the 2,000 horsepower (1,500 kW) class in an effort to improve performance. However, during the late 1930s, none of these engines was ready for production. Meanwhile, both the United States and the Soviet Union were developing bombers powered by arrangements of four smaller engines with favorable results, including excellent range and fair lifting capacity. Accordingly, in 1936, the RAF decided to investigate the feasibility of a four-engined bomber.

During the mid-1930s, the British Air Ministry released Specification P.13/36, seeking a twin-engine heavy-medium bomber suitable for "world-wide use". Further requirements of the specification included the use of a mid-mounted cantilever monoplane wing and all-metal construction, and encouraged use of the Rolls-Royce Vulture engine then in development. In response, Handley Page produced the twin-engine HP56 design to meet Specification P.13/36. Handley Page aircraft designer George Volkert had responsibility for the design.

Other candidates were submitted for the same specification, including the Avro 679, and designs from Fairey, Boulton Paul and Shorts; all submissions were designed around two-engine configurations, using the Rolls-Royce Vulture, Napier Sabre, Fairey P.24 or Bristol Hercules engines. The majority of these engines were under development at this point; while four-engined bomber designs were considered for specification B.12/36 for a heavy bomber, wings mounting two pairs of engines were still in the experimental stage and required additional testing at the Royal Aircraft Establishment (RAE). Adopting a stronger wing also required additional strengthening of the overall aircraft structure, resulting in an increase in overall weight.

In February 1937, following consideration of the designs, the Air Ministry selected Avro's submission, with Handley Page's bid chosen as "second string". Accordingly, during April 1937, the Air Ministry ordered two prototypes of each design. The introduction of the successful P.13/36 candidates was delayed by the necessity of ordering additional Armstrong-Whitworth Whitley and Vickers Wellington bombers first. In mid-1937, it was decided to order both the Avro 679 and HP56 designs "off the drawing board" in order to speed up delivery timetables.

During July 1937, Handley Page was instructed to redesign the HP56 to use a four-engine arrangement, instead of the original twin-engine configuration; by this point, the Vulture had already been suffering from reliability and performance problems. The rival Avro 679 proceeded into service as the Avro Manchester powered by a pair of Vulture engines, but was only built in limited quantities after suffering substantially from engine-related difficulties. In September 1937, the Ministry specified the use of four Rolls-Royce Merlin engines; according to aviation author Phillip J. R. Moyes, this redesign to four Merlin engines had been done "much against the company's wishes".

Towards the end of the year, a full mock-up of the design was assessed; production of a pair of HP57 prototypes commenced in March 1938. Further design modifications resulted in the definitive aircraft, now considerably enlarged and powered by four  Rolls-Royce Merlin X engines. Such was the promise of the new model that, in January 1938, the RAF chose to place their first production order for the type, ordering 100 Mk.I Halifaxes "off the drawing board", at which point the serials which had already been assigned to HP56 were switched to HP57.

Prototypes

The first prototype was built at Handley Page's facility in Cricklewood, London, It was then dismantled and transported by road to RAF Bicester (the nearest non-operational RAF airfield with suitable facilities) for reassembly. On 25 October 1939, the maiden flight of the first prototype Halifax, serial number L7244, was performed by chief test pilot Jim Cordes with E A 'Ginger' Wright as flight test observer; during this flight, the undercarriage remained locked down as an extra safety precaution.

On 17 August 1940, the first flight of the second prototype, L7245, now complete with full armament and operationally-representative equipment, was performed by Cordes from Radlett Aerodrome. The HP57 was given the service name Halifax upon its acceptance. This name followed the practice of naming heavy bombers after major towns – in this case, Halifax in the West Riding of Yorkshire. In September 1941, a production Halifax Mk.I participated in an official naming ceremony of the type, officiated by Lord Halifax and Lady Halifax.

Production

Series production of the Halifax began at Handley Page's factory at Cricklewood and at English Electric's site in Samlesbury, Lancashire. In order to speed up production, Handley Page implemented several new manufacturing techniques, including two pioneering approaches: photo-lofting and split construction. In the latter capacity, each Halifax was built from various sub-assemblies. Surface panels were flush-riveted, although the application of the matt black night bomber camouflage probably negated its benefit.

Handley Page built the assemblies and components at Cricklewood and the aircraft were assembled and flown from Radlett Aerodrome; the first production aircraft flew from Radlett on 11 October 1940.

The sizeable production run envisioned required the involvement of several external parties in addition to Handley Page. The resulting Halifax Group was established to oversee the manufacturing programme, comprising English Electric (who had previously been a valued contributor in the production of the Handley Page Hampden), various firms within the London Aircraft Production Group, Fairey Aviation, and Rootes Motors. Because of this scheme and other initiatives, the Halifax was manufactured by a variety of aviation companies at sites across the British isles.

The Halifax was produced in large numbers during the war: of the 10,018 heavy bombers produced in Britain between 1940 and 1944, 4,046 were various models of the Halifax – in excess of 40%. In all, 6,178 Halifaxes were built, the last delivered in April 1945. At the peak, 41 separate factories and dispersed units were involved in production, along with 600 subcontractors and 51,000 employees, with one Halifax completed every hour. The first English Electric-built aircraft was flown from Samlesbury on 15 August 1941.

The first production standard Halifax, the Mk.I, had a 22 ft (6.7 m) long bomb bay as well as six bomb cells in the wings, providing a bomb capacity of 13,000 lb (5,900 kg). Defensive armament consisted of two .303 in (7.7 mm) Browning machine guns in a Boulton Paul Type C nose turret, with an additional four in a Boulton Paul Type E tail turret. Some aircraft included two additional .303 in (7.7 mm) Vickers K machine guns in beam (side, or "waist") positions. Subtle modifications distinguished the Mk I aircraft. Aircraft of the first batch of fifty Mk I Halifaxes were designated Mk I Series I.

Improvements
Handley Page were initially disappointed with the performance of the Halifax which was below their predictions, much of this was because they had under estimated the aircraft's drag. Another contributory factor was Handley Page sticking to the 100 ft maximum wingspan originally demanded by the Air Ministry's P13/36, the Halifax originally had a span of 98 ft 8in whereas Avro did not adhere to that with the Manchester MkIII (i.e. the Lancaster) at 102 ft 0in. The Mk III Halifax had a wider span of 103 ft 8in and had significantly improved performance. Arguably the Merlin engine did not suit the Halifax as much as the Hercules (fitted from the MkIII on) which suited the Halifax better both aerodynamically and power wise.

The Halifax Mk I Series III featured increased fuel capacity (and larger oil coolers, the latter of which having been adopted in order to accommodate the Merlin XX engine. A dorsally-mounted two-gun Boulton Paul Type C turret replaced the beam guns.

Introduction of  Merlin XX engines and a twin  dorsal turret instead of waist guns resulted in the Halifax B Mk II Series I. The Mk II Series I (Special) achieved improved performance via the removal of the nose and dorsal turrets. The Halifax Mk II Series IA was fitted with a moulded Perspex nose (this nose became standard upon future Halifax variants), a four-gun Boulton Paul Type A dorsal turret similar to that used in the Boulton Paul Defiant, and Merlin 22 engines. The rudder overbalance / directional instability with engine(s) out problem was solved on the Mk III with the fitting of a larger D type fin (40% bigger) and modified rudder. The Mk III Halifax had satisfactory stability in all axes, and in fact were more stable in a dive than a Lancaster. A Lancaster tended to go deeper into a dive whereas a Halifax had to be forced to stay in the dive as the speed increased, i.e. it naturally flew out of a dive.

Owing to a shortage of Messier-built landing gear and hydraulics, Dowty-built landing gear were used on some aircraft instead. The Halifax Mark V were manufactured by Rootes Group at Speke and Fairey at Stockport; operationally, these were generally used by Coastal Command and for training purposes. Some 904 had been built when Mark V production ended at the start of 1944, compared to 1,966 Halifax Mk IIs.

The most numerous Halifax variant was the much improved B Mk III of which 2,091 were built. First appearing in 1943, the Mk III featured the Perspex nose and modified tail of the Mk II Series IA but replaced the Merlin with the more powerful  Bristol Hercules XVI radial engine. Other changes included the adoption of de Havilland Hydromatic propellers and a wider wing span with rounded wing tips. With the coming of the MkIII the Halifax's performance finally matched that of the Lancaster though the latter had a larger bomb load and could take larger bombs. The B.VI Halifax's performance improved still further with a cruising speed of 265 mph and a maximum speed (in 'Full Speed' supercharger mode) of 309 mph at 19,500 ft. Halifax crews, though admittedly not unbiased, considered the MkIII Halifax to be the equal of any other bomber, including the Lancaster, and further improved versions (with more powerful Hercules engines) to be superior to all. The improvement in the Halifax MKIII's performance could be measured objectively. In 1943 4 Group's Halifax squadrons flew 11,607 sorties for a loss of 485 aircraft, a loss rate of 4.2%. Halifax MKIII production started in early Autumn 1943 and for 1944, when the MkIII constituted an increasing percentage of the Halifax force, 4 Group flew 25,454 sorties for a loss of 402 aircraft, a loss rate of 1.6%.

The Halifax B Mk IV was a converted B Mk II non-production design using the Rolls-Royce Merlin 65 engine with a two-stage supercharger and a four bladed propeller fitted. This resulted in an increase in top speed by 60 mph to 324 mph at 19,000 ft. Due to a shortage of Merlins with two stage superchargers production of the B Mk IV was not proceeded with.

The definitive version of the Halifax was the B Mk VI, powered by the  Hercules 100. The final bomber version, the Mk VII, reverted to the less powerful Hercules XVI. However, these variants were produced in relatively small quantities.

The remaining variants were the Halifax C Mk VIII, an unarmed transport that was fitted with an 8,000 lb/3,630 kg cargo pannier instead of a bomb bay, which could accommodate a maximum of 11 passengers and the Mk A IX paratroop transport, which had space for up to 16 paratroopers and their equipment. A transport/cargo version of the Halifax was also produced, known as the Handley Page Halton.

Design

Overview

The Handley Page Halifax was a mostly orthodox design, a mid-wing monoplane with a tail unit featuring twin fins and rudders. The Halifax featured all-metal construction with a smooth, stressed skin covering the majority of the exterior surfaces; the flight control surfaces were an exception, being fabric-covered instead. The slab-sided fuselage contained a 22-foot bomb bay, which contained the majority of the Halifax's payload, while the cockpit was flush with the upper fuselage.

The Halifax was powered by four engines, two spaced evenly on each wing. Early production Halifax bombers were powered by models of the Rolls-Royce Merlin engine; later aircraft were commonly powered by the larger Bristol Hercules radial engine. To contain and attach the engines to the airframe, Handley Page developed their own design for the power egg instead of using the typical, slimmer Rolls-Royce counterpart; despite generating increased drag, this in-house design was readily adaptable to the alternative Hercules engine on later aircraft.

Each engine drove a Rotol-built compressed wood constant-speed propeller, enabling the Halifax B.I to attain a maximum speed of 265 mph at 17,500 feet. With a typical payload of 5,800 lbs of bombs and 2,242 imp. gal. of fuel, it had a range of 1,860 miles. The defensive armaments included power-assisted gun turrets in various positions located across the aircraft. Different models of the Halifax used different numbers and combinations of turrets, effectively trading speed for firepower and vice versa.

Crew positions and armament

The bomb aimer's position was in the extreme nose with the navigator's table located behind it, both roles fulfilled by the same crew member. Above the navigator's position was the forward gun turret. The wireless (radio) operator was behind the navigator's position, separated by a half-width partition.
On the floor just behind the front turret (or later the nose) was the escape hatch. On average 25% of Halifax and Stirling crews successfully bailed out from a damaged aeroplane, but only 15% did so from Lancasters.

The pilot sat on the left side in the cockpit above the wireless operator. The flight engineer filled in as a co-pilot, seated on a folding seat to the right of the pilot, during crucial manoeuvres such as take-off. Aft of the pilot and set lower than the pilot was the flight engineer's compartment with controls on the bulkhead. Another compartment aft of the flight engineer contained two bunks originally intended for resting crew members, but almost always used for treating and berthing injured crew. This area led to the two-gun dorsal turret. The tail gunner occupied a four-gun turret at the extreme aft end of the aircraft.

Starting with the Halifax Mk II Series IA and from the Mk III onwards, the nose turret was deleted; instead the bomb-aimer occupied a streamlined perspex nose containing a single hand-held machine gun. On later-built aircraft, the two-gun dorsal turret was replaced by a four-gun Boulton Paul turret.

Operational service

In November 1940, the Handley Page Halifax entered service with No. 35 Squadron at RAF Linton-on-Ouse. Its operational debut occurred on the night of 10–11 March 1941, when six Halifax bombers flew a bombing raid against Le Havre, targeting the area around the docks and any shipping that might be present. The existence of the Halifax was not officially acknowledged until July 1941, after it was used in a daylight attack on La Pallice, France, against the German battleship Scharnhorst. At the end of 1941, the Halifax was withdrawn from daylight bombing operations after intensifying fighter opposition had increased the casualty rates to unsustainable levels.

In the second half of 1942, No. 35 Squadron and four other squadrons were selected to form the Pathfinder Force, later expanded to become No. 8 Group. Pathfinder crews flying the Halifax would mark routes and identify and mark targets for the Main Force. Effective marking greatly increased the accuracy and destructive power of Bomber Command. As a Pathfinder and Main Force aircraft, the Halifax was a core part of the bombing offensive against Germany and its Axis allies.

By the end of 1943, No. 4 Group had been entirely equipped with the Halifax, and would continue to operate the aircraft until the end of the war. No. 6 Group, formed of Royal Canadian Air Force (RCAF) squadrons, also adopted the Halifax around the same time, and would go on to operate it in each of its 14 squadrons, although it was never solely equipped with the type. At its peak strength, Bomber Command operated a total of 76 Halifax-equipped squadrons.

While the early-built models of the Halifax were heavily used by Bomber Command and made valuable contributions to operations, the aircraft's performance was considered unsatisfactory for the most part, mainly due to the underpowered Merlin engine, which meant that it could not fly at the higher altitudes needed to avoid enemy fighters, which were becoming increasingly effective throughout 1943. This was answered by the Halifax Mk III, which was powered by Bristol Hercules radial engines in place of the Merlins. Introduced into service in November 1943, the Mk III was first delivered to No. 433 Squadron and No. 466 Squadron. By January 1944, the Hercules-powered Halifax was available in quantity and quickly proved to have superior performance in the face of German fighter defences.

Early on, Air Chief Marshal Arthur Harris, head of Bomber Command, was scathing in his criticism of the Halifax's performance in comparison to the new Avro Lancaster, primarily of its bomb-carrying capability: an average Halifax was calculated to drop 100 tons of bombs in its lifetime, compared to a Lancaster's 154. Harris continued to have a poor opinion of the Halifax, despite the fact that later Hercules-engined machines had lower loss rates and higher crew survival rates after abandoning the aircraft than Lancasters, and came very close to the Lancaster's speed and altitude performance. The Halifax was progressively outnumbered in front-line service over occupied Europe as more Lancasters became available from 1943 onwards; many squadrons converted to the Lancaster.

Production of the Halifax continued, supposedly because it was more efficient to keep building it than to stop its production and convert to building another aircraft. But any new facilities were devoted to the Lancaster.

Harris's view of the Halifax changed sometime after spring 1942. On 2 June 1942, in a response to a telegram sent by Frederick Handley Page, congratulating Harris on the success of the first 1000 bomber Cologne raid, he stated: "My Dear Handley Page. We much appreciate your telegram of congratulation on Saturday night's work, the success of which was very largely due to your support in giving us such a powerful weapon to wield. Between us we will make a job of it."

Following the invasion of Europe in 1944, the Halifax resumed daylight bombing operations, performing semi-tactical strikes upon enemy troop concentrations, gun emplacements, and strongpoints of the Atlantic Wall defences along the French coast with a reportedly high degree of accuracy. Other common targets were enemy communications and the launch sites for V-1 flying bombs. Bombing activity became increasingly brazen throughout late 1944 as the Luftwaffe became incapable of putting up effective opposition against allied air forces. The Halifax also found itself being increasingly tasked with transport duties around this time; in one instance, around half a million gallons of petrol was delivered to Brussels in support of the advancing Second Army, then engaged in heavy fighting at Arnhem.

During the latter half of 1944, the bombing of German-held oil facilities became a major priority of the offensive. On 27 August, a force of 216 Halifax bombers, alongside smaller numbers of de Havilland Mosquitos and Lancasters and a sizable escort of Supermarine Spitfires, conducted the first major daylight operation by Bomber Command against a target inside Germany that year, attacking the oil refinery at Homberg on the Ruhr. In spite of heavy fire from anti-aircraft defenses, no bombers were downed and the refinery was severely damaged in places. Attacks upon oil production facilities throughout Germany would become commonplace within the remaining months of the war.

The only Victoria Cross to be awarded to any Halifax pilot went to Cyril J. Barton of No. 578 Squadron for displaying great gallantry in bringing his heavily damaged aircraft back after a raid on Nuremberg on the night of 30/31 March 1944. Barton continued to fly the Halifax while other crew members bailed out. He was killed in the aircraft's crash-landing, but the remaining crew survived due to his actions.

Large numbers of Halifax bombers were also operated by Coastal Command, which used it to conduct anti submarine warfare, reconnaissance and meteorological operations. The Halifax was heavily used to deploy mines in the vicinity of enemy-held ports. It served increasingly in other support capacities as the war progressed, being used as a glider tug, an electronic warfare aircraft for No. 100 Group and to conduct special operations, such as parachuting agents and arms into occupied Europe, for the Special Operations Executive (SOE). As a glider tug the Halifax was superior to the Lancaster, the Halifax Mk III's "tug weight at take off" at 59,400 lbs was higher than a Lancaster Mk2 at 52,800 lbs.

Throughout early 1945, the Halifax was frequently dispatched against cities within the German homeland, including Hannover, Magdeburg, Stuttgart, Cologne, Münster, Osnabrück and others. During these months, infrastructure such as oil facilities and railways were given a high priority; these targets were attacked right up until the end of the war. According to Moyes, within the final few months, bomber losses had fallen to all-time lows while raids were frequently regarded as having been highly successful. During the final months of the war the improved Halifax Mk VI and Mk VII were introduced. In particular, these models had been 'tropicalised' with an eye towards their potential use in the Pacific War against the Empire of Japan. While some of these Mk VI and Mk VII machines were deployed to the theatre, they played little meaningful role as the war ended before larger numbers could be brought to bear against Japanese forces.

On 25 April 1945, the Halifax performed its last major operation against the enemy during an attack upon coastal gun batteries on Wangerooge in the Frisian Islands of the North Sea. While the type continued to fly operations after this, these were primarily diversions to other operations and sporadic, uncoordinated attacks against targets of opportunity. Upon the end of the conflict, Bomber Command quickly disbanded the majority of its Halifax-equipped squadrons; the aircraft themselves were transferred to Transport Command. During the type's service with Bomber Command, Halifaxes flew 82,773 operations and dropped 224,207 tons of bombs. 1,833 aircraft were lost.

By 1947, the majority of Halifax bombers were deemed to be surplus and scrapped. The Halifax remained in widespread service with Coastal Command and RAF Transport Command, Royal Egyptian Air Force and the Armée de l'Air until early 1952. The Pakistan Air Force, which had inherited a number of Halifax bombers from the RAF, also continued to operate them and became the last military user of the type, retiring the last aircraft in 1961.

In September 1997 Halifax 57 Rescue of Canada excavated Halifax LW682 from a bog near the River Dender in Belgium. The plane was part of RCAF 426 Squadron, and had been shot down near Geraardsbergen during a raid on Leuven, Belgium on 12 May 1944. During the excavation, the bodies of three crew members were recovered and later given proper burial. Several items from the plane were used in restoration of NA337, while other items were transferred to museums. The airframe was melted down and used to construct the ceiling of the RAF Bomber Command Memorial in London, which was unveiled in 2012.

Civilian operation

A number of former RAF Halifax C.8s were sold from 1945 and used as freighters by a number of mostly British airlines. In 1948, 41 civil Halifax freighters were used during the Berlin Air Lift, operating a total of 4,653 sorties carrying freight and 3,509 carrying bulk diesel fuel. Nine aircraft were lost during the airlift. The Low-cost airline business pioneer Freddie Laker bought and serviced war-surplus Halifaxes for Bond Air Services operations in the Berlin airlift.  With the airfreight market in decline, most of the civilian Halifaxes were scrapped on their return to England. The last civilian-operated Halifaxes were withdrawn from service in late 1952.

Variants

Pre-Halifax designs
H.P.55
Proposed twin-engine bomber aircraft, never built.
H.P.56
Proposed twin-engine bomber aircraft, fitted with two Rolls-Royce Vulture engines, never built.

H.P.57
H.P.57
L7244 – Prototype first flew on The first Halifax prototype with four Merlin 10 engines and no armament.
L7245 – Second prototype first flew from Radlett on 17 August 1940 and was more representative of the production configuration including armament.
Halifax B.I Series I

Four-engined long-range heavy-bomber aircraft powered by Rolls-Royce Merlin X engines; the first production version. Armament consisted of nose turret with two guns, tail turret with four guns and two beam guns. Recognizable from large deep radiator intakes containing circular Gallay radiators and oil cooler. 50 produced.
Halifax B.I Series II
Stressed for operating at a higher gross weight. 25 produced.
Halifax B.I Series III
Re-engined with Merlin XX engines with slimmer coolers, introduced new twin-gun Boulton Paul type C upper turret in place of beam guns, with revised undercarriage and additional centre-section fuel tanks. 9 produced.

H.P.58
Halifax Mk II
Projected variant with revised armament including 20 mm cannon and no tail turret. Due to problems with the new armament, the project was cancelled and the Mk II designation given to H.P.59.

H.P.59

Halifax Mk II
New variant with increased takeoff weight, fuel and weapons carriage.
Halifax B.II Series I
First series of the bomber variant; from March 1942 onwards, these were fitted with TR1335 navigation aids.
Halifax B.II Series I (Special), SOE
Special version for Special Operations Executive (SOE) used to drop supplies over Europe. Nose armament and dorsal turret removed, the nose being faired over, as well as changes to the fuel vent pipes and exhaust shrouds.
Halifax B.II Series I (Special)

Generally similar to the aircraft used by the SOE, these were employed in the bombing role. These aircraft were more varied in appearance, especially concerning the fitting of dorsal armament with some aircraft retaining the standard Boulton Paul "Type C" turret in different mounts with others mounting a "Type A" turret. There were also examples with no dorsal turret, similar to the SOE-aircraft.
Halifax B.II Series IA
Modified with new glazed nose section, Merlin XX or 22 engines, new square Morris radiators and new "D" fin and rudder. The dorsal turret was changed to a four-gun Boulton Paul Type A Mk VIII, and there were improvements to the bomb bay door sealing. Some aircraft were fitted with the H2S radar.
Halifax B.II Series I, Freighter
A few Mk IIs were employed in the transport role in Great Britain (unmodified SOE-aircraft) and in the Middle East (simple modifications to allow carriage of engines or Spitfire fuselages).
Halifax B.II Series II
Single aircraft (HR756) modified with three-blade Rotol propellers and Merlin 22 engines. Rejected in favour of Mk III.
Halifax A.II
According to some sources, a handful of the airborne forces Halifaxes were converted into B.IIs. If this is true they might have been designated A.II or may have retained their bomber designations.
Halifax GR.II
Coastal Command variant of the Halifax B.II.
Halifax GR.II Series I
A handful of aircraft converted from Series I or Special to GR.II standard, having differences in dorsal armament. The main difference was the fitting of a ASV.Mk 3 radar in an H2S type fairing. Sometimes, a .50 in (12.7 mm) machine gun was fitted in the faired nose.
Halifax GR.II Series IA
Definitive Coastal Command variant of the GR.II with glazed nose mounting .50 in (12.7 mm) machine gun, Merlin XX or 22 engines, B-P A-type dorsal turret and extra long-range fuel tanks in fuselage. A ventral turret holding a single .50 in (12.7 mm) machine gun was mounted on most aircraft although some employed the ASV.Mk 3 radar in its place.
Halifax Met.II
Some sources suggest that there were a meteorological variant of the B.II, designated Met.II, but this is unlikely.

H.P.61

Halifax B.III
Main production variant, fitted with Bristol Hercules engines. B.III bombers were fitted with transparent nose dome with single machine gun, Boulton Paul dorsal turret with four guns and tail turret with four guns. All but first few had longer wing with rounded wingtips that increased wingspan to 104 ft 2 in (31.75 m).  2,091 produced.
Halifax A.III
Halifax B.III bombers converted into glider tug and paratroop transport aircraft.
Halifax C.III
Halifax B.III bombers converted into military transport aircraft.

H.P.63

Halifax B.V
Four-engined long-range heavy-bomber, powered by four Rolls-Royce Merlin XX engines with square empennage and wingtips. Armament as B.III. 904 produced.
Halifax B.V Series I (Special)
Halifax A.V
Halifax B.V bombers converted into glider tugs and paratroop transport aircraft.
Halifax GR.V
Coastal Command variant. Halifax B.V bombers converted into maritime reconnaissance aircraft.

Halifax B.VI
Four-engined long-range heavy-bomber, powered by four 1,615 hp (1,204 kW) Bristol Hercules XVI radial engines with H2S radar. No dorsal turret. Square empennage, round wing tips. 643 produced.
Halifax C.VI
Halifax B.VI bombers converted into military transport aircraft.
Halifax GR.VI
Coastal Command variant. Halifax B.VI bombers converted into maritime reconnaissance aircraft.

Halifax B.VII
Four-engined long-range heavy-bomber, powered by four 1,615 hp (1,204 kW) Bristol Hercules XVI radial engines. Round wing tips. Armament as B.III
Halifax A.VII
Halifax B.VIIs converted into paratroop transport and glider tug aircraft.
Halifax C.VII
Halifax B.VIIs bombers converted into military transport aircraft.

H.P.70
Halifax C.VIII
Cargo and passenger transport aircraft.

H.P.71
Halifax A.IX
Paratroop transport, glider tug aircraft.

H.P.70 Halton
Halton I
Interim civil transport version; postwar, a number of Halifax bombers were converted into civilian transport aircraft.
Halton II
VIP transport aircraft for the Maharajah Gaekwar of Baroda.

Operators

Military operators

Royal Australian Air Force
No. 460 Squadron RAAF
No. 462 Squadron RAAF
No. 466 Squadron RAAF

Royal Canadian Air Force
No. 405 Squadron RCAF
No. 408 Squadron RCAF
No. 415 Squadron RCAF
No. 419 Squadron RCAF
No. 420 Squadron RCAF
No. 424 Squadron RCAF
No. 425 Squadron RCAF
No. 426 Squadron RCAF
No. 427 Squadron RCAF
No. 428 Squadron RCAF
No. 429 Squadron RCAF
No. 431 Squadron RCAF
No. 432 Squadron RCAF
No. 433 Squadron RCAF
No. 434 Squadron RCAF

Royal Egyptian Air Force

Free French Air Forces
No. 346 Squadron RAF (GB II/23 Guyenne)
No. 347 Squadron RAF (GB I/25 Tunisie)

Pakistan Air Force
No. 12 Squadron

Polish Air Forces in exile in Great Britain
No. 301 Polish Bomber Squadron
C Flight No. 138 Squadron RAF, later No. 1586 (Polish Special Duties) Flight before reforming as 301 Squadron Special Duties
No. 304 Polish Bomber Squadron RAF

Royal Air Force
No. 10 Squadron RAF
No. 35 Squadron RAF
No. 47 Squadron RAF
No. 51 Squadron RAF
No. 58 Squadron RAF
No. 76 Squadron RAF
No. 77 Squadron RAF
No. 78 Squadron RAF
No. 96 Squadron RAF
No. 102 Squadron RAF
No. 103 Squadron RAF
No. 108 Squadron RAF
No. 113 Squadron RAF
No. 138 Squadron RAF
No. 148 Squadron RAF
No. 158 Squadron RAF
No. 161 Squadron RAF
No. 171 Squadron RAF
No. 178 Squadron RAF
No. 187 Squadron RAF
No. 190 Squadron RAF
No. 192 Squadron RAF
No. 199 Squadron RAF
No. 202 Squadron RAF
No. 224 Squadron RAF
No. 246 Squadron RAF
No. 295 Squadron RAF
No. 296 Squadron RAF
No. 297 Squadron RAF
No. 298 Squadron RAF
No. 502 Squadron RAF
No. 517 Squadron RAF
No. 518 Squadron RAF
No. 519 Squadron RAF
No. 520 Squadron RAF
No. 521 Squadron RAF
No. 578 Squadron RAF
No. 614 Squadron RAF
No. 620 Squadron RAF
No. 624 Squadron RAF
No. 640 Squadron RAF
No. 644 Squadron RAF

Civil operators

 Aircarrier (Former Wikner aircraft)
 Geoffrey Wikner (B.III converted with a 15-passenger interior)

 Aero Cargo
 CTAI
 SANA (Societe Anonyme de Navigation Aeriennes)

 Peteair
 Vingtor Airways

 
 Alpha Airways
 LAMS (South Africa)

 Air Globe

 Air Freight
 Airtech
 Bond Air Services
 British American Air Services
 British Overseas Airways Corporation
 Chartair
 C.L. Air Surveys
 Eagle Aviation
 Lancashire Aircraft Corporation
 London Aero and Motor Services (LAMS)
 Payloads
 Skyflight
 Union Air Services
 V.I.P. Services
 Westminster Airways (converted as a bulk fuel carrier for Berlin Airlift)
 World Air Freight

Halton operators
 India
 Maharajah Gaekwar of Baroda

 Louis Breguet

 Alpha Airways

 Bond Air Services
 British American Air Services
 British Overseas Airways Corporation
 Westminster Airways
 Worldair Carrier

Surviving aircraft
Of the 6,176 Halifaxes built, three complete examples remain.

Specifications (Mk III)

Halifax 57 Rescue 

Halifax 57 Rescue is a Canadian organization dedicated to the recovery and restoration of Handley Page Halifaxes. Since its inception in 1994 the organization has recovered two aircraft, including Halifax NA337, one of only three complete examples in the world.

The organization was founded in 1994 by Karl Kjarsgaard, a Canadian former Air Canada pilot, and Ian Foster of Scotland. In 1995 they participated in their first recovery project, that of Halifax NA337 from 750 feet underwater in Lake Mjøsa, Norway. The aircraft was moved to the National Air Force Museum of Canada in Trenton, Ontario where it was unveiled in 2005 after a full restoration. Their second project was the 1997 recovery of Halifax LW682 from a bog near Geraardsbergen, Belgium. During the recovery, the bodies of three crew members were removed and given a proper burial. Several parts of the aircraft were used in the restoration of NA337, and the airframe was melted down and later used to construct the RAF Bomber Command Memorial in London, which was unveiled in 2012.

At present, Halifax 57 Rescue is working to recover two aircraft. The first is HR871, located off the coast of Sweden. Preparations are currently underway for underwater excavation. Once the aircraft has been raised, it will be moved to the Bomber Command Museum of Canada in Nanton, Alberta for restoration. The second aircraft the organization is seeking to recover is LW170 off the coast of Scotland. This aircraft has yet to be located, although its general position is known.

See also

Notes

References

Notes

Citations

Bibliography
 Barnes, C. H. Handley Page Aircraft since 1907. London: Putnam, 1987. .
 
 Buttler, Tony. British Secret Projects: Fighters & Bombers 1935–1950. Hinckley: Midland Publishing, 2004. .
 Clarke, R. M., ed. Handley Page Halifax Portfolio. Cobham, Surrey, UK: Brooklands Books, No year cited. .
 Clayton, Donald C. Handley Page: An Aircraft Album. Shepperton, Surrey, UK: Ian Allan Ltd., 1970. .
 Jones, Geoffrey Patrick. Night Flight: Halifax Squadrons at War. London: William Kimber, 1981. .
 Falconer, Jonathan. Bomber Command Handbook 1939–1945. Stroud, England:Sutton Publishing, 1998. .
 
 
 Merrick, Keith A. Halifax, an Illustrated History of a Classic World War II Bomber. Shepperton, Surrey, UK: Ian Allan, 1980. .
 Merrick, Keith A. Handley Page Halifax: From Hell to Victory and Beyond. Hersham, Surrey, UK: Ian Allan Publishing, 2009. .
 Merrick, Keith A. The Handley Page Halifax. Bourne Ends, Buckinghamshire, UK: Aston Publications, 1990. .
 Moyes, Philip J.R. Handley Page Halifax: Merlin-Engined Variants (Aerodata International No 7). Kidlington. Oxfordshire, UK: Vintage Aviation Publications, 1979. .
 Moyes, Philip J.R. The Handley Page Halifax B.III, VI, VII. Leatherhead, Surrey, UK: Profile Publications, 1966.
 Norris, Geoffrey. The Short Stirling, Aircraft in Profile Number 142. Windsor, Berkshire, UK: Profile Publications Ltd., 1966.
 Rapier, Brian J. Halifax at War. Shepperton, Surrey, UK: Ian Allan, 1987. .
 
 
 
 
 Scutts, Jerry. Halifax in Action (Aircraft in Action series, No. 66). Carrollton, TX: Squadron/Signal Publications, Inc., 1984. .
 Stachiw, Anthony L. and Andrew Tattersall. Handley Page Halifax: In Canadian Service St. Catharine's, Ontario, Canada: Vanwell Publishing, 2005. .

Videography 
 Halifax at War: The Story of a Bomber (76 min. DVD). Toronto: Nightfighters Productions, 2005. .

External links

 Photo tour of the Elvington Halifax
 Handley Page Halifax II (III)  at Yorkshire Air Museum
 One of the Many The story of a 76 Squadron Flight Engineer and his Halifax aircraft in World War II
 Krentz, Herbert. To Hell in a Halifax (2006)  – the true story of RCAF pilot Herbert Krentz, the sole survivor when his Halifax Mk V was shot down over Germany in early 1944
 Halifax at the International Bomber Command Centre Digital Archive, University of Lincoln

1930s British bomber aircraft
World War II British bombers
Aviation in Lancashire
Halifax
Glider tugs
Four-engined tractor aircraft
Mid-wing aircraft
Aircraft first flown in 1939
World War II heavy bombers
Four-engined piston aircraft
Twin-tail aircraft